Stree is a 2018 Indian Hindi-language comedy horror film directed by debutant Amar Kaushik in his directorial debut and produced by Dinesh Vijan and Raj & D.K. It stars Rajkummar Rao and Shraddha Kapoor alongside Pankaj Tripathi, Aparshakti Khurana and Abhishek Banerjee. The plot is based on the urban legend Nale Ba ("Come tomorrow") of Karnataka Modified as O Stree Kal Aana ("Oh woman come tomorrow") in the film.

In late November 2017, Raj and DK approached Rao to star in the maiden production. As part of the preparation for his role of a tailor, Rao learned to sew. In December, Shraddha Kapoor was confirmed as the film's female lead. Raj and DK brought on their first assistant director from Go Goa Gone, Amar Kaushik, to direct the film in January 2018. Principal photography began on 13 January 2018 in Chanderi. Filming took place in Bhopal and Mumbai; the final schedule was completed in May 2018. The soundtrack was composed by Sachin–Jigar with lyrics written by Vayu, Badshah and Jigar Saraiya.

Stree had its theatrical release on 31 August 2018. It received high critical acclaim upon release especially for the performances of Kapoor, Rao and others.  With earnings of over ₹180.76 crores against a budget of ₹14 crores, Stree emerged as a major critical and commercial success. The film received ten nominations at the 64th Filmfare Awards, including Best Film, Best Director for Kaushik, Best Actor for Rao, and Best Supporting Actor for Tripathi and Khurrana. It won Best Debut Director for Kaushik. The film is the first installment in Dinesh Vijan's horror-comedy universe followed by Roohi (2021) and Bhediya (2022).

Plot
The plot is based on the Indian folk legend about a witch who abducts men at night when they are alone and only leaves their clothes behind. The residents of a town named Chanderi believe in the spirit of an angry woman, referred to as "Stree", who stalks men and whisks them away during the four days of a religious festival every year, causing many disappearances over the years. To protect the residents from her wrath, "O Stree, come tomorrow" is written in Hindi (ओ स्त्री, कल आना) with bat's blood on the entrances of all homes and men are advised to not roam alone after 10 pm during the festive season, and move in groups for safety - a parallel of instructions women are usually told to follow for their own safety.

Vicky, a ladies' tailor in Chanderi, mysteriously encounters an unnamed charming woman who only comes to the town during the annual Pooja season and falls in love with her at first sight. She asks him to stitch her a lehanga. Her frequent disappearances, her shopping list including peculiar items such as a lizard's tail, white cat's fur, flowers of Datura, meat, brandy and such like presumed to be ingredients for black magic and the fact that she is not seen by anybody except Vicky, makes his friend Bittu suspicious, and he starts believing that she could be Stree. After one of his friends, Janna, is kidnapped by Stree, Vicky grows suspicious of the woman as well. He confronts her on which she disappears yet again.

They decide to find a way to save their friend and ask the town's librarian Rudra Bhaiya for help, who is also a paranologist. In Rudra's book shop, they come across a partially torn book titled "Chanderi Puran" in his library which mentions Stree's story and an old fort which Vicky claims he has seen when he was on a date with the woman. Vicky, Bittu, and Rudra then visit the old fort, which Stree is supposedly inhabiting, to find Janna. Stree drives away Bittu and Rudra and is about to attack Vicky but does not, as she senses the feeling of love and respect in his eyes. She is then driven away by the unknown woman's spell. She reveals later that she has been trying to defeat 'Stree' for the last three years after losing someone close to her and that is why she comes to the town only during the festive season. This clarifies that she & Stree are two different persons. Stree releases Janna as requested by Vicky the same night, however, he starts having sporadic violent episodes. More men go missing after a possessed Janna, under Stree's control, erases the word "Tomorrow" (कल) from the protective phrases outside everyone's homes, leaving it as "O Stree, come"; (ओ स्त्री, आना) an invitation.

Vicky, Bittu, Rudra and the woman decide to meet the book's author Shankar Shastri to find a permanent solution to save the town, and he informs them that Stree had once been an extremely beautiful courtesan who every man in town desired. At last, she found a man who truly loved her and wanted to marry her, but on their wedding night, Stree and her husband were killed by the town's jealous men. Her spirit has ever since been searching for her true love and also seeks revenge on the town by aiming to abduct every last man in it. Shastri tells them of a prophecy pointing to a savior and Vicky surprisingly appears to have all the characteristics describing the savior. Initially, Vicky believes that too until he recalls the inclusive feature of the savior, son of a courtesan. His friends then reveal the secret of him being a courtesan's son which infuriates Vicky and he leaves in haste. In a drunk state, he confronts his father to which he silently agrees to upset Vicky further but then feels grateful for his father's affection and efforts, and decides to save his town which accepted him and didn't denounce him. The friends and the woman make a trap to kill Stree but Vicky realizes that Stree only desires love and respect and hesitates with the plan. The woman then suggests Vicky simply cut her long braid - the source of her powers - so that she will be rendered powerless. He does so, and Stree vanishes. The woman leaves the city the next day and Vicky bids her farewell, forgetting to ask her name all this time. On the bus, the woman merges Stree's braid with her own hair and then vanishes from the bus, implying that she is the witch who wanted Stree's power through her braid.

Stree visits Chanderi again the following year and finds her own statue at the town entrance with a new phrase - "O Stree, protect us" (ओ स्त्री, रक्षा करना)- thus giving her respect, and she does not enter Chanderi.

Cast 
 Rajkummar Rao as Vikrant "Vicky" Parashar, a ladies tailor
 Shraddha Kapoor as The Unknown Woman (witch)
 Pankaj Tripathi as Rudra, a paranologist
 Aparshakti Khurana as Bittu, Vicky's friend
 Abhishek Banerjee as Janna, Vicky and Bittu's friend who got possessed by Stree.
 Flora Saini as Stree, a spirit that abducts men during Chanderi's festival night.
 Vijay Raaz as Shastri, the author of Chanderi Puran.
 Aakash Dabhade as Narendra
Abhishek Singh Rajput as Jaana's friend
 Atul Srivastava as Dashrath Parashar, Vicky's father
Ramkrishna Dhakad as the tailor's assistant
 Sunita Rajwar as Janna's Mother, Vicky friend's mother
 Nora Fatehi in a special appearance in song "Kamariya"
 Kriti Sanon in a special appearance in the song "Aao Kabhi Haveli Pe"

Production

Development 

In November 2017, it was reported that Dinesh Vijan had finalized Rajkummar Rao to be the lead actor for his next film, which would be a horror comedy written by Raj Nidimoru and Krishna D.K. Raj and DK revealed that the popular myth of Oh Stree Repu Ra was behind the core of idea of the film. They found the idea of ghost turning back upon reading the sign "absurd and funny." "We decided to take this idea further, and find a unique perspective to it. With the Stree now going after men, and men being afraid to go out in the night etc.. a sort of gender-reversal," they added.

In December 2017, Shraddha Kapoor informed through her Twitter handle that she would be working with Rajkummar Rao and Maddock Films in their next film. In January 2018, it was revealed that the title of the horror comedy would be Stree and Amar Kaushik would be the director of the film. As part of preparation for the role, Rao was provided with a sewing machine and a tailor would visit him every day for a period of 20 days so as to teach him the process of sewing clothes.

Filming 
Principal photography of the film began on 13 January 2018 in Chanderi, Madhya Pradesh and the first schedule was wrapped up on 30 January 2018. The second schedule of shooting took place in Bhopal in the month of March. According to producer Dinesh Vijan, the location in Bhopal was chosen because of the mysterious stories associated with the place. After reaching the place, the locals informed the production team about the unexplained events that had taken place in the area and the safety precautions that they must follow. Keeping in mind the advice given by the locals, a set of guidelines to be followed by everyone were created and placed in all the rooms inside the fort. Kapoor finished filming half of her schedule within 10 days. The final schedule of shooting was completed on 1 May 2018. After completing the shooting, a promotional song was filmed in Mumbai with Rajkummar Rao and Shraddha Kapoor during May 2018.

Soundtrack 

The music for the film has been composed by Sachin–Jigar. The lyrics are written by Vayu except for one song "Aao Kabhi Haveli Pe" which is written by Badshah and Jigar Saraiya. The score, which is composed by Ketan Sodha, who had previously worked on Talvar, also included an extract of the theme song from Mission: Impossible (1996), with an Indian instrumentation in a comedic way.

Vipin Nair of The Hindu gave the soundtrack 2.5/5 stating that it is entertaining though familiar. The Times of India based Debarati S Sen, in her review, said the album will "appeal to the masses."

Following the film's release, an additional song, "Dil Ka Darzi", not included on the official jukebox, was released by Maddock Films as a separate song intended for Rao's character, a ladies tailor, and was played in the film in the title credits. Written by Vayu, it featured him as the vocalist along with Prakriti Kakar.

Release 
Stree had its trailer released on 26 July 2018. It was released worldwide on 31 August 2018.  Stree had collected 6.83 crore in India on the first day. In its first weekend, the film crossed 32.27 crore in India, earning over its production budget of 23 crore. It crossed 60.39 crore in its first week run. In its second week movie grossed 35.14 crore net. Movie held well in week 3 and grossed 17.14 crore net. It grossed 9.99 crore net in the fourth week. Its lifetime India net was 129.90 crore. Worldwide the movie grossed 180.76 crore at end of its initial theatrical run.

Reception 
The film received positive reviews, with praise directed to the film's entertainment aspect, dialogues, frightening moments, performances and storyline.

Anupama Chopra of Film Companion gave the film 3.5 stars out of five, stating that "With laughs and scares, Stree delivers an important message." Anna M. M. Vetticad of Firstpost rated it 3.5/5. Praising Rao's acting and the film's humor, she also wrote that "The primary reason why Stree is so effective though is that it does not caricature the people of Chanderi - they are as real and foolish and prejudiced and good as most human beings are, and could well be you or me with less sophistication." Rajeev Masand of News18 also gave 3.5 out of 5: "Stree is especially entertaining, packed with laugh-aloud moments and a cast that’s on top of their game. It’s one of the most original films this year, and I recommend that you make the time for it."
Rachit Gupta of The Times of India offered 3.5 out of 5, noting the superlative writing and dialogues, but felt the film was a little too long and had some 'ambiguous ideas.'
Raja Sen of the Hindustan Times had a more moderate tone, commending the actor's energy and collaborative efforts but noting a rushed-feeling plot: "The laughs are inconsistent, and the plotting feels sloppy and rushed. The ideas are fine, but the writing needed work."

Home media

The film was originally available on Hotstar and JioCinema, but was later on also available on Netflix after Jio Studios signed a deal with the platform. The film is also available on Prime Video.

Accolades

Sequel
In October 2018, director Amar Kaushik announced that he is planning a sequel to the film. But according to sources, the original creators Raj and D.K. will not be part of it.

In February 2022, actor Rajkummar Rao revealed that the sequel to Stree is planned.

In Bhediya, Abhishek Banerjee reprised his role as Janna from the movie, thus confirming the Dinesh Vijan's horror-comedy universe. Rajkummar Rao and Aparshakti Khurana also appeared in a mid credit scene confirming that a sequel is on the cards, while Shraddha Kapoor also made a guest appearance in the song "Thumkeshwari" as Stree.

As of March 2023, the sequel to the movie is confirmed to be in pre-production stage and will go on floors from July 2023.

See also
Dinesh Vijan's horror-comedy universe

References

External links
 
 Stree at Bollywood Hungama

2018 films
2018 horror films
2010s Hindi-language films
Indian comedy horror films
Films shot in Mumbai
Films shot in Madhya Pradesh
Films based on urban legends
Films set in Madhya Pradesh
Paranormal films
Films based on Indian folklore